Huguenot is an extinct town in Elbert County, in the U.S. state of Georgia.

History
A post office called Huguenot was established in 1894, and remained in operation until 1908. The community most likely was named for the fact a share of the first settlers were descended from the Huguenots.

References

Geography of Elbert County, Georgia
Ghost towns in Georgia (U.S. state)